is a train station located in Kagoshima, Kagoshima, Japan. The station opened in 1930.

Lines 
Kyushu Railway Company
Ibusuki Makurazaki Line

JR

Adjacent stations

Nearby places
Kagoshima City Office Taniyama Branch
Kagoshima Minami High School
Kaiyo High School
Kagoshima Jōhō High School

Railway stations in Kagoshima Prefecture
Railway stations in Japan opened in 1930